C. G. Bridges was an American politician.

He was elected to the Iowa Senate from 1864 to 1868, and practiced law in Decatur City. He left Iowa for Kansas after completing his single term as a Republican state senator representing District 6. Bridges then founded the Doniphan County Dispatch, which published its first issue on 21 November 1868. In 1875, Bridges and his wife sold land in Doniphan County to John F. Wilson.

References

Year of death missing
People from Decatur County, Iowa
Iowa lawyers
People from Doniphan County, Kansas
Editors of Kansas newspapers
19th-century American politicians
19th-century American newspaper founders
19th-century American lawyers
Republican Party Iowa state senators
Year of birth missing